Hrabovec  is a village in Slovakia.

Hrabovec  may also refer to:

 Nižný Hrabovec
Vyšný Hrabovec
Ruský Hrabovec
Hrabovec nad Laborcom